Izhitsa or Izhica (Ѵ, ѵ; italics: Ѵ ѵ; OCS: Ѷжица, Russian: Ижица, Ukrainian: Іжиця) is a letter of the early Cyrillic alphabet and several later alphabets, usually the last in the row. It originates from the Greek letter upsilon (Y, υ) and was used in words and names derived from or via the Greek language, such as кѵрилъ (kürilǔ, "Cyril", from Greek Κύριλλος) or флаѵии (flavii, "Flavius", from Greek Φλάυιος). The Glagolitic alphabet has a corresponding letter with the name izhitsa as well (Ⱛ, ⱛ). Also, izhitsa in its standard form or, most often, in a tailed variant (similar to Latin "y") was part of a digraph оѵ/оу representing the sound . The digraph is known as Cyrillic "uk", and today's Cyrillic letter u originates from its simplified form.

The letter's traditional name, izhitsa (ижица), is explained as a diminutive either of the word иго (igo, "yoke"), due to the letter's shape, or of иже (izhe, "which"), the name of the main Cyrillic and Glagolitic letters for the same sound, .
 
The numeral value of Cyrillic izhitsa is 400. Glagolitic izhitsa has no numeral value. Church Slavonic editions printed in Russia use a tailed variant of the letter for the numeral purpose, whereas editions from Serbia or Romania (including books in the Romanian Cyrillic alphabet), as well as early printed books from Ukraine, prefer a basic form of the letter without the tail.

Russian 
In the Russian language, the use of izhitsa became progressively rarer during the 18th and 19th centuries. At the beginning of the 20th century, there was only one word with relatively stable spelling that included the letter izhitsa: мѵро (miro, "myrrh") and its derivatives.  
In the documents of the spelling reform of 1917–1918, izhitsa is not mentioned at all, although the statement that it was canceled at that time, along with decimal i, yat and fita, is not only widespread, but also reflected in the Great Soviet Encyclopedia. In fact, Ѵ fell out of use in the civil alphabet gradually, under the influence not only of the general direction of changes in the spelling of the Russian language, but also of the displacement of words and texts on religious topics from the civil press. At the same time, for example, steam locomotives of the Ѵ series were produced until 1931 and were in operation until they were decommissioned in the 1950s.

Serbian 
The traditional spelling of Serbian was more conservative; it preserved all etymologically motivated izhitsas in words of Greek origin. Vuk Stefanović Karadžić had reformed the Serbian alphabet in the beginning of the nineteenth century and eliminated the letter, but the old spelling was used in some places as late as the 1880s.

Church Slavonic 
Izhitsa is still in use in the Church Slavonic language. The basic distinction rule is simple: izhitsa with stress and/or aspiration marks is a vowel and therefore pronounced ; izhitsa without diacritical marks is a consonant and pronounced . Unstressed, -sounding izhitsas are marked with a special diacritical mark, the so-called kendema or kendima (from the Greek word κέντημα ). The shape of kendema over izhitsa may vary: in books of Russian origin, it typically looks like a double grave accent or sometimes like a double acute accent. In older Serbian books, kendema most often looked like two dots (trema) or might even be replaced by a surrogate combination of aspiration and acute. These shape distinctions (with the exception of the aspiration-acute combination) have no orthographical meaning and must be considered as just font style variations, thus the Unicode name "IZHITSA WITH DOUBLE GRAVE" is slightly misleading. Izhitsa with kendema (majuscule: Ѷ, minuscule: ѷ) is not a separate letter of the alphabet, but it may have personal position in computer encodings (e.g., Unicode). Historically, izhitsa with kendema corresponds to the Greek upsilon with trema (or διαλυτικά: Ϋ, ϋ). While in modern editions of ancient and modern Greek the trema is used only to prevent a digraph (as <ευ>  versus <εϋ> ), Slavonic usage of kendema still continues that of many medieval Greek manuscripts, in which the "diaeresis" sign was often used simply to mark an upsilon or iota as such, irrespective of any other vowels (e.g. δϊαλϋτϊκά, which would not be correct by today's conventions). There might be no sign of information of izhitsa with double grave accent (majuscule: Ѷ, minuscule: ѷ), but only the Unicode.

Romanian 

Traditional orthography of the Romanian language used izhitsa in the same manner as Church Slavonic, with all the above-mentioned peculiarities. This writing system was used until about 1860 in Romania and until the 1910s in church books in Moldova.

Aleut 
The Cyrillic letter izhitsa was also used historically in certain loanwords in the Cyrillic script version of Aleut.

Izhitsa as a replacement of a different character 
In Russian typography, the capital form of izhitsa has traditionally been used instead of the Roman numeral V; this tradition survived several decades longer than izhitsa as a letter of the alphabet.

The izhitsa is sometimes used in place of the new IPA symbol for the labiodental flap (ⱱ) because the signs are similar.

Computing codes

See also 
 Ү ү : Cyrillic letter ue, used in various languages as a close front rounded vowel (/y/)
 Ӱ ӱ : Cyrillic letter u with diaeresis, used in several languages as a close front rounded vowel (/y/)

Notes

References 
 A Berdnikov and O Lapko, "Old Slavonic and Church Slavonic in TEX and Unicode", EuroTEX ’99 Proceedings, September 1999 (PDF)
 F Lauritzen, Michael the Grammarian's irony about hypsilon: a step towards reconstructing Byzantine pronunciation, Byzantinoslavica 67 (2009) 231–240